Leonardo Campana Romero (born 24 July 2000) is an Ecuadorian professional footballer who plays as a forward for Major League Soccer club Inter Miami, and the Ecuador national team.

Club career

Barcelona SC
He began his career with Barcelona SC in 2016. He scored his first professional goal on 21 April 2019 against Delfín de Manta.

Wolverhampton
On 21 January 2020 he moved to English Premier League club Wolverhampton Wanderers in a three-and-a-half-year deal.

Famalicão
On 19 September, he joined Primeira Liga side, Famalicão, on a season long loan. Campana made his debut for Famalicão on 28 September 2020, being substituted for Rubén del Campo in a 2–1 victory over Belenenses SAD. Campana scored his first goal for Famalicão on 22 April 2021, during a 3–0 victory versus Gil Vicente F.C.

Grasshopper
On 16 July 2021, Campana joined Swiss Super League side Grasshopper on a season-long loan deal. His first appearance for the Swiss side came in a 2–0 defeat against Basel, where he conceded an own goal.

Inter Miami
On 20 January 2022, it was announced that Campana would join Major League Soccer club Inter Miami on a season-long loan. Campana made his debut for Inter Miami on 26 February 2022, starting in a 0–0 draw versus Chicago Fire FC. Campana scored his first goal for Inter Miami on 6 March 2022, their only goal in a 5–1 loss to Austin FC. Campana was named MLS Player of the Week for Week 6 of the 2022 season on 11 April 2022, for his hat trick against the New England Revolution. Campana signed with Miami on a permanent basis on 20 January 2023. He occupies a Young Designated Player roster slot and is signed through the end of the 2025 season, with a club option to extend through 2026.

International career
Campana started to gather attention at the 2019 South American U-20 Championship where he scored six goals in nine games as Ecuador were crowned champions.

Personal life
Campana is the son of former professional tennis player turned politician Pablo Campana, who much after representing Ecuador at the 1996 Olympics became Minister of Commerce in the Ecuadorean government of Lenin Moreno. His great-grandfather, Gabriel, won six Ecuadorian league winners’ medals in the 1920s, and his grandfather, Isidro Romero, was the president of Barcelona Sporting Club for 15 years and the team's stadium in Guayaquil, where Campana used to play, is named after him. Campana is also a United States citizen.

Career statistics

Club

Honours
Ecuador U20
South American U-20 Championship Champion: 2019 
South American U-20 Championship Top scorer: 2019
FIFA U-20 World Cup Third place: 2019

References

External links
Leonardo Campana profile at Federación Ecuatoriana de Fútbol 

2000 births
Living people
Sportspeople from Guayaquil
Ecuadorian footballers
Association football forwards
Ecuadorian Serie A players
Primeira Liga players
Barcelona S.C. footballers
F.C. Famalicão players
Grasshopper Club Zürich players
Wolverhampton Wanderers F.C. players
Inter Miami CF players
Ecuador under-20 international footballers
Ecuador international footballers
2021 Copa América players
Ecuadorian expatriate footballers
Ecuadorian expatriate sportspeople in England
Expatriate footballers in Portugal
Major League Soccer players
Ecuadorian expatriate sportspeople in Switzerland
Ecuadorian expatriate sportspeople in Portugal
Expatriate footballers in England
Expatriate footballers in Switzerland
Expatriate soccer players in the United States
Ecuadorian expatriate sportspeople in the United States
Designated Players (MLS)